Val Butnaru (born 17 April 1955) is a journalist and writer from the Republic of Moldova. He is the founder of Jurnal TV and Jurnal Trust Media.

Awards 
 Order of the Republic (Moldova) – highest state distinctions (2009)
 Premiul pentru dramaturgie UNITEM

Works
Butnaru Val, Apusul de soare se amână (Piese de teatru), Chişinău, Cartier, 2003
Butnaru Val, Cum Ecleziastul discuta cu Proverbele, Chişinău, ARC, 1999.
Butnaru Val,  Iosif şi amanta sa // Patru texte, patru autori, Chişinău, ARC, 2000
Butnaru Val, Saxofonul cu frunze roşii, Chişinău, ARC, 1998

Bibliography
Pohilă Vlad, Val Butnaru –  Calendar Naţional, Biblioteca Naţională a Republicii Moldova, 2005
Cheianu Constantin, Despre teatrul lui Val Butnaru – Butnaru, Val. "Apusul de soare se amână",Chişinău, Cartier, 2003
Proca Pavel, Mâine, sau poate poimâine se amână; Portrete cu jobenu-n sus, Chişinău, 2004

See also 
 Jurnal Trust Media
 Jurnal TV
 Jurnal de Chişinău

References

External links 
 Timpul de dimineaţă, Val Butnaru a adus nomazii la UNITEM
 Val Butnaru aduce pe masa cititorilor „Cartea nomazilor din B.”
 Val Butnaru şi-a lansat primul roman
 Val Butnaru: RM este impanzita de FSB si total aservita Rusiei

1955 births
Living people
Moldovan journalists
Male journalists
Writers from Chișinău
Moldova State University alumni
Jurnal Trust Media
Recipients of the Order of the Republic (Moldova)